During the 1997–98 English football season, Wigan Athletic F.C. competed in the Football League Second Division.

Season summary
In the 1997–98 season, Wigan didn't start the campaign very well and by the end of November, sat in the bottom four and were favourites to go down before the season started and it seemed a possibility at that stage. By 21 February, their fortunes didn't really improve and were still in the relegation battle in 17th and two points clear of the relegation zone. From then onwards, Wigan went on a great run of form to end the season with seven wins from their final 15 league games and finished in a satisfying 11th place.

Final league table

 Pld = Matches ; W = Matches won; D = Matches drawn; L = Matches lost; F = Goals for; A = Goals against; GD = Goal difference; Pts = Points
 NB: In the Football League goals scored (F) takes precedence over goal difference (GD).

Results
Wigan Athletic's score comes first

Legend

Football League Second Division

FA Cup

League Cup

Football League Trophy

Squad

References

Wigan Athletic F.C. seasons
Wigan Athletic